The Jurchens were a Tungusic people who inhabited the region of Manchuria (present-day Northeast China) until the 17th century, when they adopted the name Manchu.

List of Jurchen chieftains during the Liao dynasty (926–1115)

"Tamed" Jurchens or Shu Jurchen (熟女眞)

"Wild" Jurchens or Sheng Jurchen (生女眞) 
 Wanyan Hanpu 完顏函普 (金始祖) (941–960)
 Wanyan Wulu 完顏烏魯 (金德帝) (960–962)
 Wanyan Bahai 完顏跋海 (金安帝) (962–983).
 Wanyan Suike 完顏綏可 (金獻祖) (983–1005): In 1003, under his leadership the Wanyan tribe united five tribes in a federation called the "Five Nations" (wuguobu 五國部: Punuli (蒲努里/蒲奴里/蒲聶), Tieli 鐵驪, Yuelidu (越裡篤國), Aolimi (奧里米國), and Puali 剖阿里國).
 Wanyan Shilu 完顏石魯 (金昭祖) (1005–1021)
 Wanyan Wugunai 完顏烏古迺 (金景祖) (1021–1074): Meanwhile, King Hyung ordered  to continue and finish the work of building a wall (Cheolli Jangseong) from Song-ryung Pass (in the mouth of the Yalu River ner Uiju in the west to the borders of the Jurchen tribe in the north-east around Hamheung)
 Wanyan Helibo (完颜劾里钵) Shizu (金世祖) (1074–1092)
 Wanyan Pochishu 完顏頗剌淑 (金肅宗)  (1092–1094)
 Wanyan Yingge (完颜盈歌) Muzong (金穆宗) (1094–1103)
 Wanyan Wuyashu (完顏烏雅束/完颜乌雅束) Kangzong (金康宗) b. 1061 (1103–1113)
 Wanyan Aguda (完颜阿骨打) Taizu (金太祖) b. 1068 (1113–1123)

The Jin dynasty (1115–1234)

List of Jurchen chieftains during the Yuan dynasty (1234–1368)

List of Jurchen chieftains during the Ming dynasty (1368–1644)

List of Jianzhou Jurchens chieftains 
Located on the banks of Hun River(渾江)

Odoli Clan (1405–1616) (俄朵里 or 斡都里 or 斡朵里 or 吾都里 or 斡朵怜) 

 Bukūri Yongšon (布库里雍顺)
 Mengtemu (孟特穆) or Möngke Temür (童孟哥帖木兒) (1405–1433) (Temple name: Zhàozǔ 肇祖)
 Cungšan (充善) b. 1419 (1433–1467) (Temple name: Chúndì 纯帝)
 Fanca († 1458)
 Tolo (妥罗) (1467–1481) (Temple name: Xīngdì 兴帝)
 Sibeoci Fiyanggū (锡宝齐篇古) (1481–1522) (Temple name: Zhèngdì 正帝)
 Fuman (福满) (1522–1542) (Temple name: Xingzu 兴祖)

Huligai Clan (胡里改) (1403–? ) 

 Ahacu (阿哈出) (Li Sicheng) (李思誠) († 1409–1410)
 Šigiyanu 釋加奴 (Li-Hsien-chung/Li Xianzhong)  (李顯忠)
 Li-Man-chu (Li Manzhu (李滿住) (b. 1407 – † 1467)

The Maolian (毛憐) Jurchens (1405–?) 
Synonyms: Wu-liang-ha, Orankha, Oranke (兀良哈/乙良哈) according to Korean records, Orangai (瓦爾哈;オランカイ) according to Japanese records.
Location: They settled south of the Suifen River (绥芬河 or 速平江), on the north-west of Hui-ning under the leadership of one of Ahacu (阿哈出)'s sons.

Udige Clan (兀狄哈) 

 They invaded Joseon territory in 1402, in 1410, in 1436 (see 곽승우(郭承祐) and 조연(趙涓)), in 1460 with the Oranke (see also 신숙주(申叔舟))
 They were beaten by the Korean General Heo Jong 허종(許琮) (1434–1494) in 1491, under Seongjong of Joseon's reign (see also 조산보(造山堡) and 나사종(羅嗣宗))

Suksuhu River / Suksuhu bira (蘇克素護 or 苏克苏护 毕拉)  Clan: Aisin Gioro 
 Wang Gao  (王杲) († 1575)
 Atai (阿台) (1575–1583) & 阿海 & 阿弟
 Nikan Wailan (尼堪外兰) († 1586)
 Giocangga (觉昌安) (1542–1571) (Temple name: Jǐngzǔ 景祖)
 Taksi (塔克世) (1571–1583) (Temple name: Xiǎnzǔ 显祖)
 Nurhaci (努尔哈赤) (Temple name: 太祖)

Hunehe Bira (唿呐呵 毕拉 or 渾河 部)

Wanggiya (汪佳)

Donggo (董鄂)

Jecen aiman (哲陳 部)

Neyen (訥殷)

Jušeri (珠舍哩 or 图色哩)

List of Haixi Jurchens chieftains 
Located near the banks of Songhua River

Hulun confederation (扈伦) 

 Kesina 克什纳

Yehe or Yehe Nara (葉赫 / 叶赫) Clan 
Location: banks of Yehe River south of Changchun
 Singgen Darhan 星垦达尔汉/星根達爾漢
 Sirke Minggatu 席尔克明噶图/席爾克明噶圖
 Cirgani 齐尔噶尼/齊爾噶尼
 Cukungge 祝孔格/褚孔格
 Taicu 太杵
 Yangginu (楊吉砮) & Cinggiyanu (淸佳砮) († 1584)
 Narimbulu (纳林布录) (1584–1613) 庚寅
 Jintaiji (金台石) (1613–1619) (己巳)

Hata/Hada Clan  (哈達 / 哈达) (1543–1601) 
Location: south of the Yehe Clan (east of Kaiyuan), the southernmost among the Haixi Jurchens.

 Wangji Wailan (旺济外兰(王忠))
 Wang Tai (萬汗/王台) 1548–1582
 Hurhan 扈尔罕 1582
 Menggebulu 孟格布录 1582–1599
 Ulhūda 武尔古岱 1599–1601

Ula (烏拉/乌拉) Clan (1405–1616) 
Location: Hulan River (north of Harbin)
 Buyan 布顔
 Bugan 布干
 Mantai (满泰) (?–1596), the father of Lady Abahai (阿巴亥)
 Bujantai (布占泰) (1596–1618), the younger brother of Mantai

Hoifa Clan (輝發 / 辉发) (?–1607) 

 Wangginu 汪加奴(王机砮)
 Baindari 摆银答里 († 1607)

List of Yeren Jurchens (野人) chieftains

Other important chieftains

See also 
 List of Manchu clans
 Aisin Gioro
 Jurchens

References 
 THE CAMBRIDGE HISTORY OF CHINA The Qing Empire To 1800 
 Jurchen tribes

 
History of Manchuria
Qing dynasty
Jurchens
Lists of Chinese monarchs
History-related lists